DS may refer to:

 Diodorus Siculus (D.S. or DS), a first-century BCE Greek historian
 D/s, short for dominance and submission
 Dunajská Streda, a town in Slovakia using the car registration DS
 Enchiridion symbolorum, definitionum et declarationum de rebus fidei et morum, book of Catholic dogma, abbreviated DS for "Denzinger-Schönmetzer"
 , linguistic glossing abbreviation for "different subject" in switch-reference
 Demon Slayer: Kimetsu no Yaiba, a popular Japanese manga series written by Koyoharu Gotōge

Arts and entertainment

Video games 
 Nintendo DS, handheld game console
 Deca Sports, a sports video game series
 Deca Sports, the first game of the series
 Double Spoiler, a game in the Touhou Project series
 Dark Souls, a series of action role-playing games
 Dark Souls, the first game in the series
 Death Stranding, an action game
Don't Starve, a survival game

Music 
 "D.S." (song), a 1995 song by Michael Jackson
 Dal segno, a navigation marker in music notation
 "DS 21", a 1989 song by Jane Child from Jane Child

Government, law, and politics 
 Committee for State Security (Bulgaria), a former Bulgarian secret service
 Democratici di Sinistra (Democrats of the Left), a former Italian political party
 Democratic Party (Demokratska stranka), a political party in Serbia
 Detective Sergeant, UK police rank
 Detective Superintendent, UK and Australian police rank
Bureau of Diplomatic Security, in the U.S. Department of State

Science, technology, and mathematics 
 Dwarf spiral galaxy (dS)
 Darmstadtium, symbol Ds, a chemical element
 Data science
 Degree of substitution, relative density of substituent groups in a polymer
 Dielectric spectroscopy, measuring dielectric properties of medium
 Directional symmetry (time series)
 Dnepropetrovsk Sputnik, a class of Soviet satellites

Computing and telecommunications 
 DS register of X86 processor
 Avid DS, editing and effects application
 Delegation Signer, DNSSEC record type
 DirectShow, Microsoft API
 Nintendo DS

Mathematics 
 ds (elliptic function), one of Jacobi's elliptic functions
 dS, De Sitter space

Medicine 
Down syndrome, a medical condition
Duodenal switch, a weight-loss surgery

Transportation 
 DS Automobiles, a French car marque
 Citroën DS Inside (2009 car) concept car
 Citroën DS (1955-1975) car model 
 EasyJet Switzerland (IATA code DS)

Weapons 
 7.92 DS, a Polish-designed anti-tank ammunition type
 DS-39, Degtyaryova Stankovyi Model 1939, a Russian medium machine gun

See also 
 
 
 D (disambiguation) for Ds the plural of "D"